Egbert is a name that derives from old Germanic words meaning "bright edge", such as that of a blade. Anglo-Saxon variant spellings include Ecgberht and Ecgbert. German variant spellings include Ekbert and Ecbert.

People with the first name

Middle Ages
 Ecgberht of Kent, king of Kent (ruled 664–673)
 Egbert or Ecgberht of Ripon (died 729), Anglo-Saxon saint, monk and Bishop of Lindisfarne
 Egbert or Ecgbert of York (died 766), Archbishop of York
 Ecgberht II of Kent (died c. 784), king of Kent
 Egbert of Lindisfarne (died 821), Bishop of Lindisfarne
 Egbert of Wessex, king of Wessex (ruled 802–839)
 Ecgberht I of Northumbria, king of Northumbria (deposed 872; died 873)
 Ecgberht II of Northumbria, king of Northumbria (ruled c. 876–883)
 Egbert (archbishop of Trier) (c. 950–993)
 Egbert of Liège, educator and author
 Egbert I, Margrave of Meissen (d. 1068)
 Egbert II, Margrave of Meissen (c. 1060–1090)

Later times
 Egbert Bakker (born 1958), Dutch classical scholar
 Egbert Baqué (born 1952), German gallerist, author and translator
 Egbert Benson (1746–1833), New York jurist and politician, a founding father of the United States
 Egbert Brieskorn (1936–2013), German mathematician
 Egbert B. Brown (1816-1902), Union general in the American Civil War
  (1745–1806), Frisian nobility and politician
 Egbert Cadbury (1893-1967), British Royal Navy First World War pilot and businessman
 Egbert Cleave (fl. 1870s), American author
 Egbert Nathaniel Dawkins III (born 1979), American musician known as Aloe Blacc
 Egbert van Drielst (1745-1818), Dutch painter
  (1909-2000), East German military leader and politician
 Egbert B. Groen (1915-2012), American politician and lawyer
 Egbert Hambley (1862–1906), British-born American mining engineer
 Egbert Hayessen (1913–1944), German World War II resistance fighter 
 Egbert van Heemskerk (1634–1704), Dutch Golden Age painter
 Egbert Hirschfelder (born 1942), German rower
 Egbert Ho (born 1978), Dutch field hockey player
 Egbert C.N. van Hoepen (1884–1966), Dutch paleontologist
 Egbert Jahn (born 1941), German political scientist
 Egbert Kankeleit (born 1929), German nuclear physicist
 Egbert Xavier Kelly (1894–1945), Irish De La Salle Brother
 Egbert Bartholomeusz Kortenaer (1604-1665), Dutch admiral of the United Provinces of the Netherlands
 Egbert Adriaan Kreiken (1896–1964), Dutch teacher and astronomer
 (1608–1674), Dutch clockmaker
 Egbert Lucas (1878–1958), British Anglican Archdeacon
 Egbert van 't Oever (1927–2001), Dutch speed skater and speed skating coach
 Egbert van der Poel (1621–1664), Dutch Golden Age painter
 Egbert Rimkus (died 1996), German tourist famous for disappearing in Death Valley
 Egbert Schuurman (born 1937), Dutch engineer, philosopher, and politician
 Egbert Stephens (born 1952), Guyanese cricketer
 Egbert Streuer (born 1954), Dutch sidecar driver
 Egbert Don Taylor (1937–2014), Jamaican Episcopelian bishop
 Egbert Ten Eyck (1779–1844), American lawyer and politician, US congressman from New York
 Egbert Van Alstyne (1878–1951), American songwriter and pianist
 Egbert van Kampen (1908-1942), Belgian mathematician
 Egbert Ludovicus Viele (1825-1902), American engineer, politician and Civil War brigadier general
  (1866–1943), Dutch shipowner and builder
 Egbert White (1894–1976), American war correspondent
 Egbert Austin Williams (1874–1922), Bahamian American Vaudeville comedian

People with the surname
 Albert Gallatin Egbert (1828–1896), U.S. Representative from Pennsylvania
 Harry C. Egbert (1839–1899), US Army brigadier general
 James Chidester Egbert, Jr. (1859–1948), American classical scholar and educator
 James Dallas Egbert III (1962–1980), American college student involved in a widely covered disappearance
 Joseph Egbert (1807–1888), U.S. Representative from New York
 Rae L. Egbert (1891–1964), New York politician
 Sherwood Egbert (1920–1969), president of Studebaker-Packard Corporation
 William Egbert (1857–1936), Canadian physician and politician

Fictional characters
 John Egbert, in the webcomic Homestuck
 Egbert B. Gebstadter, fictional author who appears in the works of Douglas Hofstadter

Dutch masculine given names
German masculine given names
Surnames of German origin

nl:Egbert (voornaam)
pl:Egbert (imię)